The Girlfriend is a 1988 Argentine-German historical drama film directed by Jeanine Meerapfel and starring Liv Ullmann, Cipe Lincovsky and Federico Luppi. It was written by Osvaldo Bayer, Alcides Chiesa, Jeanine Meerapfel and Agnieszka Holland. The film was selected as the Argentine entry for the Best Foreign Language Film at the 62nd Academy Awards, but was not accepted as a nominee.

Plot
María and Pancho (Liv Ullmann and Federico Luppi) are a happily married couple in a quiet, working-class suburb south of Buenos Aires, circa 1978. They share the grief over the disappearance of their eldest son Carlos (Gonzalo Arguimbau), with María's lifelong friend Raquel Kessler (Cipe Lincovsky), a feisty Jewish girl whose cultural identity made her a target to some; but all the more endearing to María, her only gentile childhood friend.

"Married" to the theatre, in which she became prominent, Raquel's career has been protected from anti-Semitic attacks by her lover Diego (Victor Laplace), an influential public television executive who skillfully maintains a balance between his love for the opinionated Raquel and the need to placate the repressive mindset prevalent in that era's last civil-military dictatorship (1976-1983).

María's relentless search for her son strains her relationship with both her husband and Raquel, who give up hope after lengthy and costly attempts to find him. Raquel's own Jewish identity and fondness for roles "discouraged" by the dictatorship such as Antigone cause her serious problems, as well, and lead to her exile in Berlin. María, who had always led a quiet life, earns the growing respect of her fellow Mothers of the Plaza de Mayo, women from all walks of life united by their search for their detained sons and daughters (most of whom were known by the dictatorship to be uninvolved in political violence).

This mission becomes her life's passion and eventually leads her to Berlin, where a German Argentine exile tells her of his having seen Carlos near death at one of the many secret government detention centers, an anecdote rejected by the grieving María, who returns to Buenos Aires driven to find her son. Raquel herself returns to Argentina following democratic elections in 1983, finding that Diego is unhappily married and that María will never accept the death of her son as fact. Bewildered, Raquel nearly gives up on María; finding instead that the bonds of a lifelong friendship endure.

Cast
 Liv Ullmann ... María
 Cipe Lincovsky ... Raquel Kessler
 Federico Luppi ... Pancho
 Víctor Laplace ... Diego
 Lito Cruz ... Tito, the police lieutenant
 Nicolás Frei ... Commando squad leader
 Harry Baer ... Raquel's friend in Berlin
 Gregor Hansen ... Witness to Carlos' torture
 Gonzalo Arguimbau ... Carlos
 Fernán Mirás ... Pedro
 Max Berliner ...Cemetery caretaker
 Beatriz Thibaudin ... Unsympathetic neighbor
 Bárbara Mujica ... Maria's dubbed, Spanish-language voice

See also
 List of submissions to the 62nd Academy Awards for Best Foreign Language Film
 List of Argentine submissions for the Academy Award for Best Foreign Language Film

References

External links
 
 La Amiga - Die Freundin at filmportal.de
 

1988 films
German drama films
West German films
Argentine drama films
Argentine black-and-white films
1988 drama films
1980s German-language films
1980s Spanish-language films
Films about Latin American military dictatorships
Films directed by Jeanine Meerapfel
Films set in Buenos Aires
Films shot in Buenos Aires
1988 multilingual films
Argentine multilingual films
German multilingual films
1980s German films